Cogny may refer to the following places in France:
 Cogny, Cher, a commune in the department of Cher
 Cogny, Rhône, a commune in the department of Rhône

See also
 René Cogny (1904-1968) French general